Johann Friedrich Dryander (26 April 1756, in Sankt Johann, Saarbrücken – 29 March 1812, in Sankt Johann, Saarbrücken) was a German painter.

Dryander created several portraits of French officers, notably:
 French troops before Saint-Jean-lès-Sarrebruck, on display at the Musée historique Lorrain in Nancy, 1804
 Portrait of a general, on display at the Fine Arts museum in Rouens
 Portrait du Général Bella. 1795, Salon-de-Provence
 Portrait du Citoyen Laboucly, Inspecteur de la Viande. 1794, Saarbrücken
 Portrait of Dominique Joseph Garat, 1794, Vizille, musée de la Révolution française
 Portrait du général Jourdan et de son adjudant. 1794, Vizille, musée de la Révolution française.

Two more are mentioned in the Dictionnaire des ventes d'art by Docteur Mireur, 1911:
 Portrait du colonel du 6° chasseurs. 1795, sold for 445 fr in December 1899, present whereabouts unknown.
 Général en chef et aide de camp. 1794, sold for 310 fr in 1899, present whereabouts unknown.

Bibliography
 Lohmeyer: Die Kunst in Saarbrücken in Mitt. d. rhein. In: Vereins f. Denkmalplfege und Heimatschutz. VI, 1912, 1, p. 64.
 Ralph Melcher: Johann Friedrich Dryander ein Künstler zwischen Fürstenhof und Bürgerturm. Saarbrücken, Saarland museum 16 September 2006- 7 January 2007 (Catalogue of exhibition)

See also
 List of German painters

Notes and references 

1756 births
1812 deaths
18th-century German painters
18th-century German male artists
German male painters
19th-century German painters
19th-century German male artists